Malpensa Aeroporto Terminal 1 is a railway station serving Terminal 1 of Milan–Malpensa Airport. It opened in 1999 as Malpensa Aeroporto, as the then western terminus of the Busto Arsizio–Malpensa Airport railway, and is managed by Ferrovienord. In 2016, following the 3.4 kilometer railway extension to Terminal 2, the station was renamed Malpensa Aeroporto Terminal 1.

Train services
The train services are operated by Trenord and TILO and run on a clock-face schedule:

 Trenord Malpensa Express: Malpensa Airport T2-Malpensa Airport T1-Saronno-Milan Cadorna/Milan Centrale, with quarter-hourly frequency (2 trains per hour to Cadorna, 2 to Centrale)
 TILO S50: Malpensa Airport T2-Malpensa Airport T1-Gallarate-Varese-Mendrisio-Lugano-Bellinzona, with hourly frequency

References

External links
 

Airport railway stations in Italy
Ferrovienord stations
Railway stations in Lombardy
Railway stations opened in 1999
1999 establishments in Italy
Railway stations in Italy opened in the 20th century